Lick Run is a small tributary of Roaring Creek in Columbia County, Pennsylvania, in the United States. It is entirely in Locust Township. Its watershed has an area of 5.97 square miles. It is designated as a coldwater fishery and Class A Wild Trout Waters. Brown trout inhabit it, as to 14 other fish species. Numerous species of macroinvertebrate also inhabit the stream.

Course

Lick Run starts in southern Locust Township north of a mountain. It flows northeast into central Locust Township and then turns north for a short distance. The stream then turns northeast, passing the community of Newlin, and then gradually turns north again. Shortly downstream, it enters Roaring Creek some distance southeast of Slabtown.

Hydrology, geography, and geology
In a visual assessment on a scale of 0 to 28 (with a higher number indicating higher quality), Lick Run scored 16.5 at Poorhouse Road. At Mill Road, near its mouth, the stream scored 20.5.

Lick Run experiences siltation in its lower reaches.

 upstream of its mouth, the water temperature of Lick Run was observed to be  on July 31, 2003.

The stream has an elevation of  about sea level at its mouth.

Watershed
Lick Run is in the Catawissa, Mount Carmel, and Ashland United States Geological Survey quadrangles. The stream's watershed has an area of 5.97 square miles.

56 percent of Lick Run is within  of a road and 97 percent is within  of a road. All of the stream's length is within  of a road. None of the stream is public, but 70 percent of it is private and open. The remaining 30 percent is private and closed.

The population density of the watershed of Lick Run was 30 people per square kilometer in 2000.

Fish
Lick Run is designated as a coldwater fishery. The Roaring Creek Watershed Coldwater Conservation Plan has suggested that it be promoted to high-quality coldwater fishery status. It has also been a Class A Wild Trout Water for brown trout. The stream was stocked by the Pennsylvania Fish and Boat Commission until 1982.

Fifteen species of fish, including brown trout, bass, sculpin, chub, suckers, and minnows, inhabit Lick Run. Ten are present in the stream's middle reaches and fourteen are present at its mouth.

Macroinvertebrates
Near Poorhouse Road on Lick Run, the macroinvertebrates Isonychiidae and Hydropsychidae are common, with 10 to 25 individuals of each being observed during a biological survey here. The macroinvertebrates Cambaridae, Ephemerellidae, Peltoperlidae, Nigronia, Philoptamidae, and Rhyacophilidae are less common, with a biological survey observing 3 to 9 individuals of each. The taxa Oligochaeta, Oligochaeta, Turbellaria, Baetidae, Perlidae, and Ptilodactylidae are rare, with fewer than three individuals of each taxon being observed during a biological survey here.

See also
South Branch Roaring Creek
Mugser Run
List of rivers of Pennsylvania

References

External links

Rivers of Columbia County, Pennsylvania
Rivers of Pennsylvania
Tributaries of the Susquehanna River